Metropolitan Partnership, Ltd. is a company engaged in real estate development in the Washington metropolitan area. It is notable for its unsuccessful bid to redevelop the Old Post Office Pavilion into a 245-room Waldorf Astoria hotel in partnership with Hilton Worldwide. Among its completed projects are the redevelopment of the former headquarters of The Washington Star at 1101 Pennsylvania Avenue, Tysons International Plaza, and Fairfax Square, all designed by architect David Childs, of Skidmore, Owings and Merrill.

History
In 1979, after completing graduate studies at Harvard University, Cary Euwer joined Cabot, Cabot & Forbes in Boston, Massachusetts, where he first worked on 60 State Street. He then set up the firm's Washington, D.C. office and developed 1201 Pennsylvania Avenue.

In 1983, he developed 250 West Pratt Street in Baltimore, Maryland with Skidmore, Owings and Merrill. 

In 1984, Euwer founded Metropolitan.

By 1991, the firm had redeveloped the headquarters of The Washington Star at 1101 Pennsylvania Avenue, Tysons International Plaza, and Fairfax Square.

With the development of Fairfax Square, the firm forged relationships with several luxury retailers, including Tiffany & Co., Hermès, Louis Vuitton, Gucci and Fendi. 

In 1998, the firm managed the retail re-positioning and construction of the ABC and Disney Studios at 1500 Broadway in Times Square, also with David Childs.

In 1999, the company partnered with Koll Development Company to develop office buildings for communications and technology firms in Northern Virginia.

In 2007, in partnership with Zaremba Group, the company developed Westchester Commons, a 900,000 square foot shopping mall in Richmond, Virginia.

In 2007, Metropolitan acquired from Birchwood Development Corporation, The Jericho Atrium, as well as two other Birchwood holdings in Jericho, New York, including a 6,800-square-foot office building that had been Birchwood's headquarters, prior to the sale of the retail portion of their portfolio to Kimco.

Failed bid to redevelop the Old Post Office Pavilion
In 2012, the company bid on a request for proposal from the General Services Administration to redevelop the Old Post Office Pavilion. The proposal submitted by the company included converting the building into a 245-room Waldorf Astoria hotel. After losing the bid to an affiliate of Donald Trump, the company appealed, but was rejected by the General Services Administration.

10 Light Street
In 2012, the company acquired and began the redevelopment of 10 Light Street in Baltimore, Maryland into 455 apartments. In 2015, the company secured a lease with Under Armour for one of the floors. The property was financed in part by $28 million in revenue bonds. A penthouse unit at the property was listed for rent for $12,000 per month, the highest rents in Baltimore.

1 Light Street
The company also redeveloped 1 Light Street, adjacent to its development at 10 Light Street, into office space.

Former Alex Brown Building
In 2017, the company began redevelopment of the former Alex Brown building in Baltimore, Maryland into a 170-seat restaurant called the Alexander Brown Restaurant.

References

1984 establishments in Maryland
Real estate companies of the United States